Gilbert Elliot, Elliott or Eliott may refer to:
 Sir Gilbert Elliot, 1st Baronet, of Minto (c1650–1718), Member of the Parliament of Scotland, judge of the Court of Session as Lord Minto
 Sir Gilbert Elliot, 2nd Baronet, of Minto (c1693–1766) MP for Roxburghshire 1722–1726, judge of the Court of Session from 1726 as Lord Minto, Lord Justice Clerk from 1763
 Sir Gilbert Elliot, 3rd Baronet, of Minto (1722–1777) MP for Selkirkshire 1753–65 for Roxburghshire 1765–77, Treasurer of the Navy 1770
 Sir Gilbert Eliott, 3rd Baronet, of Stobs, MP for Roxburghshire 1708–15 and 1726–27
 Gilbert Elliot-Murray-Kynynmound, 1st Earl of Minto, (1751–1814), British politician and diplomat
 Gilbert Elliot-Murray-Kynynmound, 4th Earl of Minto (1845–1914), also known as Viscount Melgund, British politician, Governor General of Canada, and Viceroy of India
 Gilbert Elliott (1843–1895), builder of the CSS Albemarle
 Gilbert Elliott (cricketer) (1870–?), Barbadian cricketer
 Gilbert Elliot (priest), Dean of Bristol
 Gilbert Eliott (Australian politician) (1796–1871), Speaker of the Queensland Legislative Assembly

See also
 Gilbert–Elliott model  for describing burst error patterns in transmission channels